Ahmed Ayoub (Arabic أحمد أيوب); born (August 5, 1971), is an Egyptian former football striker. He is currently the assistant coach of the Egyptian national football team with the manager Hossam El Badry.

Ayoub was a member in Egypt U-20 squad which participated in 1991 FIFA World Youth Championship.

Titles and honors

Al Ahly
 Egyptian League (3):  1994-1995, 1995-1996, 1996-1997
 Egypt Cup (1):  1995-1996
 CAF Cup Winners' Cup (1): 1993 
 Arab Super Cup (1): 1997
 Arab Club Champions Cup (1): 1996
 Arab Cup Winners' Cup (1): 1994

References

External links
 
 

1971 births
Living people
Egyptian footballers
Egypt international footballers
Association football forwards
Al Ahly SC players
El Qanah FC players
Haras El Hodoud SC players
Egyptian Premier League players
Egyptian football managers
Al Ahly SC managers
Haras El Hodoud SC managers